Contact is Freda Payne's fourth American released album and her second for Invictus Records. The majority of the material on this album contains sad themes, with the exception of "You Brought the Joy." The album begins with a dramatic 11-minute medley of "I'm Not Getting Any Better" and "Suddenly It's Yesterday," both of which were written by Brian Holland and Lamont Dozier. Some people thought that Holland and Dozier were trying to compete with Diana Ross's hit "Ain't No Mountain High Enough" as both songs contain spoken segments and dramatic musical arrangements. The only cover song is "He's in My Life", which was an album track by The Glass House featuring Freda's sister Scherrie Payne. It was written by Brian Holland, Lamont Dozier and Eddie Holland (under their common pseudonym "Edythe Wayne" to avoid copyright claims by their former employer Motown), jointly with Ron Dunbar.

Three singles were lifted from this album: "Cherish What Is Dear to You (While It's Near to You)," "You Brought the Joy," and "The Road We Didn't Take."  The anti-war protest song of "Bring the Boys Home" was released before the latter two to high demand and was not included in the first 50,000 copies of this album. After it became a hit (giving Payne her second gold record), it replaced "He's in My Life" as the album's fourth track.

Track listing

Later pressings contain the 1971 hit "Bring the Boys Home"  in place of "He's In My Life" as the fourth track on side one.

Album credits
All songs published by: Gold Forever Music Inc., BMI
Produced by: Greg Perry, William Weatherspoon and Ronald Dunbar
Arrangers: H.B. Barnum, McKinley Jackson and Tony Camillo
Engineers: Lawrence T. Horn, Barney Perkins
Album design/concept: CRAIGBRAUNINC
Photography: Steve Berman
Jacket/poster: Mfg'd by SOUND PACKAGING CORP.

Charts

 Album

 Singles

References

1971 albums
Freda Payne albums
Invictus Records albums
Albums arranged by H. B. Barnum